Gary M. Burge (born 1952) is an American author and professor. He is a New Testament scholar at Calvin Theological Seminary in Grand Rapids, Michigan. He is also an ordained minister in the Presbyterian Church (U.S.A.)

Early life and education  
Gary M. Burge attended the University of California, Riverside, where he studied political science and religious studies, followed by a year at the American University of Beirut, Lebanon, where he studied at the Near East School of Theology. Following graduation from the University of California, Riverside, he earned an M.Div. degree from Fuller Theological Seminary and a Ph.D. in New Testament Studies at King's College, Aberdeen University, Scotland, working under I. Howard Marshall. His dissertation, The Anointed Community: The Holy Spirit in the Johannine Community was published in 1987.

Professional background 
Burge specializes in the contextual and historical background of the New Testament.  His research has centered on the gospels, in particular the Fourth Gospel, about which he has published numerous books and articles. He is a regular teacher at Willow Creek Community Church in South Barrington, Illinois, and a frequent speaker at churches and conferences. After 25 years at Wheaton College, he moved in 2017 to Calvin Theological Seminary in Grand Rapids, Michigan, USA.

He has also published on the theological implications of the Israel-Palestine conflict. His Whose Land, Whose Promise: What Christians Are Not  Being Told About Israel and the Palestinians  (2003, revised 2013) was his first book in this area. His second volume, Jesus and the Land: The New Testament Challenge to Holy Land Theology (2010) is a theological examination of how the New Testament interprets the land promises of the Old Testament.

Burge also provides development workshops for college and seminary faculty. This is based on his recent work on the integration of psychology with faculty career development. His work in this area can be found in his Mapping Your Academic Career. Charting the Course of a Professor's Life (2015).

Select works 
 
 
 
 
 
 
 
 
 
 
 
 
  - forthcoming Oct 2019

References

External links 
 [Personal website] http://www.garyburge.org
 [Professional website] https://www.calvinseminary.edu/about/faculty/gary-m-burge/

New Testament scholars
Bible commentators
1952 births
American theologians
American Presbyterian ministers
American biblical scholars
Presbyterian writers
Alumni of the University of Aberdeen
Living people